California's 3rd State Assembly district is one of 80 California State Assembly districts. It is currently represented by Republican James Gallagher of Yuba City.

District profile 
The district consists of much of the northern Sacramento Valley, along with parts of the adjacent foothills. The district is primarily rural.

Butte County – 91.0%
 Biggs
 Chico
 Gridley
 Oroville
 Paradise

Colusa County – 47.6%
 Colusa

All of Glenn County
 Orland
 Willows

All of Sutter County
 Live Oak
 Yuba City

All of Tehama County
 Corning
 Red Bluff
 Tehama

All of Yuba County
 Marysville
 Wheatland

Election results from statewide races

List of assembly members 
Due to redistricting, the 3rd district has been moved around different parts of the state. The current iteration resulted from the 2011 redistricting by the California Citizens Redistricting Commission.

Election results 1992 - present

2020

2018

2016

2014

2012

2010

2008

2006

2004

2002

2000

1998

1996

1994

1992

See also 
 California State Assembly
 California State Assembly districts
 Districts in California

References

External links 
 District map from the California Citizens Redistricting Commission

03
Sacramento Valley
Government of Butte County, California
Government of Colusa County, California
Government of Glenn County, California
Government of Sutter County, California
Government of Tehama County, California
Government of Yuba County, California
Chico, California
Carmichael, California
Citrus Heights, California
Colusa, California
Gridley, California
Marysville, California
Oroville, California
Paradise, California
Rancho Cordova, California
Red Bluff, California
Roseville, California
Willows, California
Yuba City, California